The World Rugby Women's Sevens Player of the Year is awarded annually at the World Rugby Awards by World Rugby.

Winners and nominees

Winners with multiple nominations

References 

World Rugby Awards